James F. Steffen is an American ecologist with expertise in Midwestern United States flora and fauna.

Career
At the Chicago Botanic Garden in Glencoe, Illinois Steffen leads ecological restoration, management activities, and research studies in the Mary Mix McDonald Woods, a 100-acre oak woodland complex. His expertise is broad, ranging from the identification and natural history of Midwest plants, birds, bats, spiders and other arthropods, and worms, to native plant propagation and restoration ecology. Steffen's most recent studies have focused on the ecology and composition of soil and leaf litter communities, such as the association between invasive European buckthorn (Rhamnus cathartica) and European earthworms (Lumbricus spp.).

Selected publications

References

Living people
American ecologists
American entomologists
American ornithologists
American naturalists
Botanists active in North America
20th-century American botanists
21st-century American botanists
Year of birth missing (living people)